Downer State Forest, also known as Charles Downer State Forest, covers   in Sharon, Vermont in Windsor County. The forest is managed by the Vermont Department of Forests, Parks, and Recreation. The forest was established in 1910 by a gift from Charles Downer to establish a forestry demonstration area.

Activities in the forest include hiking, mountain biking, cross-country skiing, snowshoeing, snowmobiling, horseback riding, hunting and wildlife viewing. It is also managed for timber resources.

The Vermont Association of Snow Travelers grooms the forest road as a snowmobile trail in the winter.

History
The forest was established in 1910 by a gift from Charles Downer to create a forestry demonstration area. The forest features conifer plantations he planted. The state forest highway, Camp Downer, and fishing pond were built by the Civilian Conservation Corps.

References

External links
Official website
http://www.campdowner.com/

Vermont state forests
Protected areas of Windsor County, Vermont
Sharon, Vermont
Civilian Conservation Corps in Vermont
1910 establishments in Vermont
Protected areas established in 1910